The 1997 CIBC Canadian Senior Curling Championships were held January 25 to February 2 at the Thornhill Golf and Country Club in Thornhill, Ontario.

Men's

Teams

Standings

Results

Draw 2

Draw 3

Draw 5

Draw 8

Draw 10

Draw 11

Draw 13

Draw 16

Draw 18

Draw 20

Draw 22

Playoffs

Tiebreaker

Semifinal

Final

Women's

Teams

Standings

Results

Draw 1

Draw 4

Draw 6

Draw 7

Draw 9

Draw 12

Draw 14

Draw 15

Draw 17

Draw 19

Draw 21

Playoffs

Semifinal

Final

External links
Men's statistics
Women's statistics

References

1997 in Canadian curling
Canadian Senior Curling Championships
Curling in Ontario
1997 in Ontario
Thornhill, Ontario
Sport in Vaughan
January 1997 sports events in Canada
February 1997 sports events in Canada